Henry Wittmann (December 17, 1885 – March 1968) was an American cyclist. He competed in the men's quarter mile and men's half mile events at the 1904 Summer Olympics.

References

External links
 

1885 births
1968 deaths
American male cyclists
Olympic cyclists of the United States
Cyclists at the 1904 Summer Olympics
Sportspeople from Lincoln, Nebraska